A status offense is an action that is prohibited only to a certain class of people, and most often applied only to offenses committed by minors. 

In the United States, the term status offense also refers to an offense such as a traffic violation where motive is not a consideration in determining guilt. In the United Kingdom and Europe, this type of status offense may be termed a regulatory offence.

Usage
Definitions of status offense vary. A neutral definition may be "[a] type of crime that is not based upon prohibited action or inaction but rests on the fact that the offender has a certain personal condition or is of a specified character." The Federal Sentencing Guidelines states that a juvenile status offense is a crime which cannot be committed by an adult. For example, possession of a firearm by a minor, by definition, cannot be done by an adult. In some states, the term "status offense" does not apply to adults at all; according to Wyoming law, status offenses can be committed only by people under 18 years of age.

Juvenile status offenders are distinguished from juvenile delinquent offenders in that status offenders have not committed an act that would be considered a crime if it were committed by an adult, whereas delinquent youths have committed such an act.

Some sexting laws and broadly interpreted child pornography laws have effectively made sexting by a minor into a status offense, but it is treated by the legal system as a criminal offense, punishable by long prison terms and large fines. It is de facto a status offense since an adult is allowed to possess a nude image of themselves but a minor is not allowed to possess or distribute a nude image of themselves.

Examples
Status offenses may include consumption of alcohol, truancy, and running away from home. These acts may be illegal for persons under a certain age, while remaining legal for all others, which makes them status offenses.

Status offense may also apply to other classes, including laws forbidding ownership of firearms by felons, where such ownership is otherwise legal.

Laws that prohibit certain actions to certain persons based on their sex, race, nationality, religion, etc., are also status offenses. A law that prohibits men from using public toilets intended for women, as well as a law that sets a curfew for people below a certain age, are examples of status offenses.

Status offenses from the past that are no longer operative include:
 The Nuremberg Laws (Germany, 1935–1945) banned sexual relations between Jews and non-Jewish Germans.
 Various laws in the United States prohibited marriage (and, in some cases, sexual relations) between White people and African-Americans (and, in some cases, Asians and Native Americans). These were enacted at the state level; some states had anti-miscegenation laws and some did not. The first of these laws was enacted in 1691 in Virginia and the last were voided in 1967 in the Loving v. Virginia case.
 South Africa's Prohibition of Mixed Marriages Act (1949–1985) prohibited sexual relations (as well as marriages) between people of different races.
 Various other places, at other times, have promulgated anti-miscegenation laws prohibiting sexual relations between members of specified different races.

See also
 Person in need of supervision
 Quasi-criminal
 Regulatory offences
 Victimless crime
 Youth rights

References

Minimum ages
Juvenile delinquency
Criminal law
Family law
Discrimination